Cole Green is a hamlet in Hertfordshire, England. It is in the Hertingfordbury Ward of East Herts District Council. Residents of note include Sky Sports boxing commentator Nick Halling.

It formerly had a railway station on the Hertford and Welwyn Junction Railway.

References

Hamlets in Hertfordshire
East Hertfordshire District